The Astoria River is a short river in Jasper National Park, Alberta, Canada. It is an early tributary of the Athabasca River.

The Astoria forms in the Tonquin Valley, collecting meltwater from the Fraser Glacier, The Ramparts, Mount Erebus, Mount Clitheroe, and Oldhorn Mountain.

The Astoria River, as well as nearby Astoria Pass, are named after John Jacob Astor. Fur traders of the American Fur Company, owned by Astor, traveled east over Athabasca Pass from Fort Astoria, at the mouth of the Columbia River.

Tributaries
Eremite Creek
Campus Creek
Verdant Creek

See also
List of Alberta rivers

References

Rivers of Alberta